The following is a list of characters that first appeared in the BBC soap opera EastEnders in 2004, by order of first appearance.

Dom Shaw 

Dom Shaw, played by Lloyd McGuire, is a board member on the Walford Community Centre committee. When Sharon Watts (Letitia Dean) wants to hold a 2004 Valentine's Day ball in the Community Centre. she needs to get an alcohol license, but Community Centre manager Derek Harkinson (Ian Lavender) is unable to obtain one due to a previous criminal conviction for growing cannabis. When Shaw discovers Derek's conviction, he sacks him, but is persuaded to reinstate him by Martin Fowler (James Alexandrou). He later obtains a license for the Community Centre himself.

Jill Green 

Jill Green, played by Elizabeth Rider, is a nurse who works at Walford General Hospital. She first appears in February 2004 when Ronny Ferreira (Ray Panthaki) has a kidney transplant. She appears again in January 2007 after Deano Wicks (Matt Di Angelo) and Chelsea Fox (Tiana Benjamin) are in a car crash. She is seen again in May 2008 after Roxy Mitchell (Rita Simons) runs over Pat Evans (Pam St. Clement).

JJ 

JJ, played by Daniel Anthony, is a teenage runaway who breaks into the Abercorn Bed & Breakfast, disturbing the proprietor Patrick Trueman (Rudolph Walker) and his fiancée, Yolande Duke (Angela Wynter). When confronted, JJ tells the couple that he is 16 and is living on the streets, so they soften, letting him stay when he offers to help out around the place. Patrick's stepson Paul Trueman (Gary Beadle) takes a dislike to JJ and is suspicious of him. When Yolande offers to wash JJ's jacket, he is evasive and it is revealed he stole some jewellery from her. Paul informs JJ's social worker, Mattie George (Chizzy Akudolu), who arrives to collect JJ and reveals he is only 14 and has run away from care. Patrick and Yolande are furious with Paul and later visit JJ in care and learn that his mother is in prison. This experience leads to their decision to foster.

Wilfred Atkins

Wilfred Atkins, played by Dudley Sutton, is Nana Moon's (Hilda Braid) fiancée, whom she meets on the bus travelling to her holiday in Eastbourne. She brings him back to Walford in March 2004 to meet her grandsons Alfie and Spencer (Shane Richie and Christopher Parker). Alfie is cautious of Wilfred at first, thinking he is only interested in Nana's money, but Wilfred tells Alfie that he is rich and has fallen in love with Nana. Alfie's wife Kat (Jessie Wallace) later agrees that Wilfred can move into The Queen Victoria pub when he and Nana are married.

Alfie is later enraged that Wilfred has not booked a honeymoon, and takes him to the travel agents to book one. Wilfred later admires the war medals of Nana's late husband William Moon (Dickon Tolson), then surprises Nana with the news that he has booked a honeymoon in the West Indies. Alfie welcomes him into the family. On his wedding day, Wilfred gets nervous and tries to run away, only to be caught by Alfie at Walford East station. He confides in Alfie that he is ill, and does not want Nana to become his nurse. Alfie agrees to let Wilfred leave, but when he hugs Wilfred he feels a sharp pain, and opens Wilfred's jacket to reveal William's medals.

Wilfred is exposed as a con artist. Alfie does not want to have to break the news to his grandmother, so he takes Wilfred back to the pub, where he confesses to stealing the medals. Nana reveals that she knew all along and forgives Wilfred, but he flees Walford along with £30,000 that he has conned out of Pat Evans (Pam St. Clement).

Chrissie Watts

Chrissie Watts, played by Tracy-Ann Oberman, first appears in April 2004 as the second wife of the show's "most enduring character", Den Watts (Leslie Grantham), becoming a prominent regular for the next 18 months. In 2005 she is the focus of one of "the programme's biggest and most high-profile narratives" when she kills her husband in a fit of rage during the special 20th anniversary episode. The broadcast, airing on 18 February, was watched by 14.34 million people, with "almost 60% of possible viewers" tuning in to see Chrissie take revenge. The character was credited by former head of BBC Drama Serials, Mal Young, as "anchoring the success of the anniversary storyline", and was described on the news programme BBC Breakfast as the "centrepiece" of the show, with the on-screen drama playing out over the course of the year and culminating in Chrissie's departure in December.

Jane Beale

Jane Beale, played by Laurie Brett, makes her first appearance on 22 June 2004 and soon starts a romance with Ian Beale (Adam Woodyatt). Jane has an affair with Grant Mitchell (Ross Kemp), though her and Ian overcome this and marry in 2007. Soon after Steven Beale (Aaron Sidwell) returns to Walford soon after, and mistakenly shoots Jane in the stomach, leaving her unable to have children. Brett took maternity leave in 2011 and Jane departed on 19 May. Jane returned to screens on 8 November before departing the series on 27 January 2012. The character returned permanently in 2014.

Eddie

Eddie, played by Daren Elliott Holmes, made his first appearance on 5 July 2004 as the right-hand man and personal bodyguard of Andy Hunter (Michael Higgs), the reigning crime kingpin of Albert Square in Walford - a fictionalized borough in East London. Throughout his duration on the show, Eddie helps Andy expand his criminal empire and gangland reign upon Walford. This involves Andy ordering Eddie to get the upper hand over his rivals, as well as celebrate his wedding to local businesswoman Sam Mitchell (Kim Medcalf) - which is nearly ruined after her cousin Billy (Perry Fenwick) and ex-boyfriend Minty Peterson (Cliff Parisi) try to warn Sam's mother Peggy (Barbara Windsor) about Andy's scheme to extract control of the Mitchell family assets. However, they fail and Andy later sends Eddie to warn off Billy and Minty. It is at this point where Eddie has crossed path with Andy's best-friend Dennis Rickman (Nigel Harman) and sworn nemesis Alfie Moon Alfie Moon (Shane Richie).

Towards Christmas 2004, Eddie observes Andy employing Billy's friend Paul Trueman (Gary Beadle) into the business so he could expand his criminal empire on drug dealing. When Eddie approaches the rendezvous point to carry out Andy's preparations, however, Andy deduces that Paul has set them up in a police sting operation - which prompts him to have Eddie leave the area and get rid of all evidence that traces their would-be involvement in the apparent drug operation. Eddie does so and Andy later has Paul killed in retribution, which inevitably sparks a conflict between Paul's adopted father Patrick (Rudolph Walker) and Andy himself when Paul's body is recovered the following month.

Soon afterwards, Andy orders Eddie to investigate Alfie's two cousins Jake (Joel Beckett) and Danny (Jake Maskall) upon becoming enemies with them. In doing so, Eddie finds out that Jake and Danny are henchmen working for their mob boss Johnny Allen (Billy Murray). He subsequently informs Andy, who thereupon alerts Johnny to the square so he can take care of Jake and Danny. It is then Johnny begins to usurp Andy from his gangland reign, up to the point where Andy rants against Johnny in front of Eddie and their fellow neighbours in The Queen Victoria public house. Andy's outburst towards Sam prompts Johnny and his friend Den Watts (Leslie Grantham), the pub's landlord, to ban Andy from the pub and throw him out along with Eddie. Thereafter Andy tells Eddie that he plans to con Johnny out of his £750,000 in a criminal transaction between them. While Eddie attempts to warn Andy about crossing Johnny with his plan, Andy insists that it is doing ahead regardless. This causes Eddie to observe Andy's go-ahead with his plot by having Danny help out, after Jake was originally authorized to help until Johnny cut him out of getting involved at the last minute.

On the night Andy puts his scheme into motion, Eddie appears to contribute after helping Andy flee Walford with the £750,000. However, as they drive out of the city, Eddie pulls over near a motorway bridge and claims that he needs to go to the toilet. Andy gives him permission to go, but it later turns out Eddie has actually betrayed Andy by alerting Johnny of his plan and location. Off-screen, Eddie witnesses Johnny and Jake arrive at where Andy is to intercept him - with Jake retaking Johnny's £750,000 from Andy whilst Johnny himself orders Andy to take a walk with him on the motorway bridge. This causes Andy to discover Eddie's betrayal too late, and he reluctantly does so. Moments later, with Jake and Eddie watching from their cars, Johnny kills Andy by forcing him off the motorway bridge - which causes Andy to fall to his death. Johnny then returns to his car with Jake and they flee from the scene, though not before Johnny tells Eddie "I don't wanna see you again"; which implies that Johnny has ordered Eddie to leave Walford for good in order to destroy all traces of his involvement to Andy's death. Eddie complies with Johnny's orders regardless, and leaves Walford for good.

The character Eddie makes his final appearance on 18 February 2005, the show's 20th anniversary episode where Andy is ironically killed off towards the broadcast's climax.

David Collins

David Collins, played by Dan Milne, is the first husband of Jane Collins (Laurie Brett) who suffers from Huntington's disease and lives in a hospice. Jane keeps David a secret from her new boss Ian Beale (Adam Woodyatt), but one day Ian demands to know why she is infrequent with her work, and Jane takes him to meet David. Ian regularly visits him until David dies on New Year's Eve 2004, leaving Jane heartbroken, as she had had sex with Ian prior to his death.

In January 2008, it is revealed that Jane's brother Christian Clarke (John Partridge) had been in love with David.

Sarah Cairns

 
Sarah Cairns, played by Alison Pargeter, is a barmaid in Angie's Den nightclub. She first appears when Martin Fowler (James Alexandrou) and his friends pretend to have a stag party to get free drinks. Martin gets very drunk and is seen flirting with Sarah. The following morning, Martin wakes up in Sarah's bed. Martin admits to Sarah that he has made a mistake as he is married, and Sarah seems to back off. However, it soon emerges that Sarah is mentally unstable and begins stalking Martin as well as sending him text messages declaring her love for him. Sarah eventually runs in front of a car knowing that Martin's wife Sonia Fowler (Natalie Cassidy) will see. Sonia is a nurse, so she looks after Sarah and they become friends. Meanwhile, Sarah convinces herself that Martin loves her and that he will leave Sonia to be with her.

Martin keeps the truth about Sarah from Sonia but Sarah tells Martin's family she is dating a "certain" married man, and later confesses to Martin's mother, Pauline Fowler (Wendy Richard) that it is Martin. Martin finds the pressure intolerable and reports Sarah to the police, but they do not believe him. While he is out, Pauline "falls" off a stepladder, and Sarah disappears. Martin tracks her down and threatens her until she confesses that she pushed Pauline. He tells Sarah he will kill her if she shows her face again. Sarah calls the police and Martin spends most of the day at the police station. During this time Sarah goes to the Fowlers' house and tells Sonia of Martin's deceit. When Martin arrives, he apologises to Sonia and promises it meant nothing and will never happen again. When Sonia forgives him, Sarah refuses to leave, still adamant that she and Martin are meant to be together. She finally admits that although Martin fell asleep in her bed, they did not have sex. Sarah realises she can never be with Martin so she stabs him in his stomach with a pen knife. During the fight, Sonia picks up a fruit bowl, hits Sarah on the head with it, and then calls an ambulance for Martin. Sarah falls unconscious and is later committed to a mental institution.

Radio Times included Sarah in their feature profiling 'bunny boilers' and of her duration they stated: "If she's not a regular on her way to being written out, she's a guest who appears, causes havoc, and then vanishes again. [...] Sarah was one such, a barmaid in Angie’s Den who stalked, harassed and finally stabbed Martin Fowler when he refused to dump Sonia. Last heard of in an institution."

Keith Miller

Keith Miller, played by David Spinx, arrives with his partner Rosie (Gerry Cowper), their twins Darren (Charlie G. Hawkins) and Demi (Shana Swash), joining Rosie's son Mickey (Joe Swash) and moving into 27 Albert Square. He cannot read and is work-shy, tending to sit around watching television all day, making excuses to Rosie as to why he doesn't go and find employment. Yet Rosie yearns for them to get married. However Keith's reluctance to commit and his failure to get a job lead to Rosie leaving Walford in July 2006, along with Demi and her daughter Aleesha.

Demi Miller

Demi Miller, played by Shana Swash, is the daughter of Keith and Rosie Miller (David Spinx and Gerry Cowper), and the twin sister of Darren (Charlie G. Hawkins). She moves to Albert Square with her family in September 2004, joining her half brother Mickey (Joe Swash). Aged 13 when she first arrives, Demi becomes the talk of the Square due to her pregnancy. She gives birth to her daughter Aleesha Miller in October.

Darren Miller

Darren Miller, played by Charlie G. Hawkins, is the son of Keith and Rosie Miller (David Spinx and Gerry Cowper), and the brother of Demi (Shana Swash). He moves to Albert Square with his family in September 2004, joining his half brother Mickey (Joe Swash). Hawkins discussed his character in 2004: "Darren's a bit of a rough kid. He's a great character to play. There are resemblances of myself in there, although that's a matter of opinion. It's good to play someone like that, where you can have a laugh".

Clint

Clint (real name Beverly) is a recurring character played by Huggy Leaver. He appears from 2004 to 2006 as Rosie Miller's (Gerry Cowper) brother.

Clint first arrives in his old ice cream van, loaded with all the Millers' possessions. The ice cream van bears the somewhat dubious logo of Clint's Creamy Whip. He comes to Walford to help out his family whenever they need him. He is also seen when Mike Swann (Mark Wingett), Rosie's ex-husband, is staying with the Millers and Keith (David Spinx) needs some support. His last appearance is when he helps Rosie to move back out of the Square.

Clint's ice cream van however makes a reappearance around August bank holiday 2007. Clint is on holiday so Mickey and Keith are left to mind the van. They use the van to sell ice creams to fund a DIY project of painting Summer Swann's nursery. Eventually, Clint gives the van to his nephew Darren (Charlie G. Hawkins).

Rosie Miller

Rosie Miller , played by Gerry Cowper, Her first appearance is 9 September 2004 and she was axed in 2006, with her final scenes airing in July 2006. Rosie is the mother of Mickey Miller (Joe Swash), Dawn Swann (Kara Tointon), Demi Miller (Shana Swash) and Darren Miller (Charlie G. Hawkins). Described as "hardworking", she is heavily protective over her family and makes enemies such as Pauline Fowler (Wendy Richard).

Tommy Grant

Tommy Grant, played by Robert Cavanah, is the much older boyfriend of Vicki Fowler (Scarlett Johnson) who is attracted to Vicki's stepmother Chrissie Watts (Tracy-Ann Oberman). They kiss and Tommy arranges for them to meet in the toilets in the Queen Victoria pub. He strips naked and Chrissie steals his clothes, exposing him (as a cheat, and literally exposing him). He then runs away through the market, naked.

The next day, as he gets into a taxi to the airport, Vicki's father Den Watts (Leslie Grantham) gets into the taxi with him and takes him to Angie's Den night club, where he pins him down and warns him to leave Walford and never return. Tommy now lives in Thailand.

Ray Taylor

Ray Taylor, played by Dorian Lough, is the abusive father of Leo (Philip Dowling) and husband of Trisha (Cathy Murphy). He hates Keith Miller (David Spinx) from a business deal-gone-wrong, and so is horrified when Keith's daughter Demi (Shana Swash) gives birth to Leo's daughter, Aleesha (Freya and Phoebe Coltman-West). He bans Leo from having contact with the Millers, and drags Leo and Trisha from the church when they attend Aleesha's christening.

When Trisha and Ray plan to move away to Scotland with Leo, he runs away with Demi and Aleesha. Leo takes a heroin overdose just before they are found, and Ray is last seen at the hospital when Leo dies from the overdose.

Aleesha Miller

Aleesha Miller is born on the show on 29 October 2004, and is played by twins Freya and Phoebe Coltman-West.

Aleesha is the infant daughter of teenagers Demi Miller (Shana Swash) and Leo Taylor (Philip Dowling). Aleesha's godparents are Demi's older brother Mickey Miller (Joe Swash) and Pauline Fowler (Wendy Richard), whose heart softens towards Demi' family after accompanying Demi to hospital for Aleesha's birth. Aleesha is the centre of an ongoing feud between Demi's parents Keith and Rosie Miller (Gerry Cowper) and Leo's parents Ray and Trisha Taylor, with she, Demi and Leo bear the brunt of the turmoil. Demi and Leo take her with them when they run away together. They leave her with Pauline when they have to move into a squat. This leads to Leo's death from a heroin overdose, when Demi takes some heroin to numb her pain and Leo overdoses because he thinks she is dead. Aleesha leaves Walford with Rosie and Demi in July 2006 to live in the Cotswolds.

Leo Taylor

Leo Taylor, played by Philip Dowling, is Demi Miller's (Shana Swash) boyfriend. He first appears in October 2004 visiting his and Demi's new born baby daughter Aleesha (Freya and Phoebe Coltman-West).

In May 2005, the Millers return to their former home in a block of flats whilst a rat problem in the square is being dealt with. Demi is reluctant, as it means she is likely to see Leo. Upon their arrival, Leo's father Ray (Dorian Lough) and his wife Trisha (Cathy Murphy) are the first people they see, and they receive a cold reception. Whilst taking Aleesha for a walk, Demi is teased by some of her brother Darren's (Charlie G. Hawkins) old friends, who mock her and refer to her as "Vicky Pollard". Upon heading back to the flats, Demi sees Leo and tries to escape in a lift, but Leo stops her. They realise their split had been due to their parents meddling and denying contact between the two, and they reunite. Demi tells Leo that it is Aleesha's christening the following day. Despite appearing reluctant, Leo and Trisha attend the christening, however the service is interrupted by Ray, who viciously drags his wife and son away whilst a heartbroken Demi looks on. The christening continues back at Clint's (Huggy Leaver) flat, and Demi and Leo meet later that evening from their balconies. As the feud between the Millers and the Taylors escalates, Leo plans to run away, and begs Demi to come with him. Demi agrees, but Leo abandons her when she insists on taking Aleesha. Demi returns to Walford, devastated, but is delighted when she meets Leo near the swings. Leo promises her he will keep in contact, and will wait as long as it takes to be with her.

Leo, Demi and Aleesha run away, and Leo starts dealing drugs. Demi takes some of the drugs to numb her pain and she passes out. Leo returns to her and thinks she has died, so takes a heroin overdose and dies in hospital.

Leo and Demi's storyline was likened to Romeo and Juliet by Jane Simon of the Daily Mirror.

Stacey Slater

Stacey Slater, played by Lacey Turner, makes her first appearance on 1 November 2004. The character is introduced as a feisty and troublesome teenager, an extension of the already established Slater clan. She features in numerous high-profile storylines, including abortion, drug abuse, mental illness, an affair with her father-in-law Max (Jake Wood) and the murder of Archie Mitchell (Larry Lamb). In 2010, Stacey is involved in a love triangle with local resident Janine Butcher (Charlie Brooks) and Ryan Malloy (Neil McDermott), the father of her daughter Lily. Janine discovers that she murdered Archie and blackmails her, which forces Stacey to flee the country with Lily on Christmas Day 2010.

Freddie Slater

Frederick "Freddie" Slater (previously Mitchell), played by twins Alex and Tom Kilby, was conceived in late 2003 when his mother, Little Mo Slater (Kacey Ainsworth), was raped by her friend, Graham Foster (Alex McSweeney). Her refusal to abort the baby caused the break-up of her marriage to her husband Billy Mitchell (Perry Fenwick). Little Mo stayed with her older sister, Belinda Peacock (Leanne Lakey/Carli Norris) in Kent, where she gave birth to Freddie. After Graham is sentenced to eight years imprisonment, Little Mo and Billy make another attempt at their marriage, but they separate again after Billy admits that he is struggling to accept Freddie. Freddie then lives at the Slater family household with Little Mo, her sister Kat (Jessie Wallace), her grandmother Big Mo (Laila Morse), her father Charlie (Derek Martin) and her cousin Stacey (Lacey Turner).

Freddie goes to hospital seriously ill with bleeding on the brain. A few days before the hospital admission, Little Mo admits to her boyfriend Oliver Cousins (Tom Ellis), who is also a GP, that she sometimes gets very irritated with Freddie when he cries. When Oliver hears that Freddie's injury must have been caused by shaking or rough handling, he admits what Little Mo has told him to a paediatrician, Briony Campbell (Rae Hendrie), at the hospital. While the hospital believes that Little Mo may have shaken Freddie, Little Mo suspects that Ben Mitchell (Charlie Jones) may have hurt him in some way as they were left unsupervised together just before the incident. Little Mo confronts Ben and shakes him in irritation when he tries to run away. After extensive tests at the hospital, it is discovered that Freddie has a temporary low platelet count, due to an infection, meaning that any minor injury could hurt him badly, as his blood isn't clotting properly. Little Mo is no longer suspected of hurting Freddie. Freddie later leaves Walford with Little Mo, who wants to start a new life in Barnstaple, Devon.

Freddie returns to Walford in September 2022, having decided to track down Billy, whom he thinks is his father, after having an argument with Little Mo. Billy keeps up the pretence of being his father, to the annoyance of his partner Honey Mitchell (Emma Barton), so as not to hurt Freddie. Freddie starts to bond with his assumed half-siblings Janet (Grace) and Will (Freddie Phillips), and even steals a fascinator Janet has her eye on to make her happy. When Billy is arrested for the murder of Malcolm Keeble and needs money to hire a good solicitor, Freddie becomes determined to help him out and gets a job at the chippy, having blagged to Bobby Beale (Clay Milner Russell) that he has loads of experience. Despite getting off to a bad start, Bobby gives him another chance and Freddie becomes an instant success with the customers by offering to deep fry anything they want. Freddie initially lives with his aunt Kat and her fiancé, Phil Mitchell (Steve McFadden) but after Phil tells him that Billy is not his father, a rift develops between the pair and he moves in with Kat's cousin Stacey and her family, eventually joined by Kat's ex-husband, Alfie Moon (Shane Richie). Billy explains to Freddie that while it is true he is not his father, he wishes that he was and if it is not too late, would like to act as a surrogate father to him, which Freddie accepts. Due to his cheerful and laid back personality, Freddie soon settles into life in Walford and becomes close friends with Bobby as well as building solid relationships with Stacey and her mother Jean Slater (Gillian Wright).

Reintroduction

In July 2022, it was announced that Freddie would be returning to the series, now portrayed by Bobby Brazier. He is set to return to Walford in autumn 2022 as an 18-year-old with "a heart of gold but can't help getting himself into mischief". His return aired on 6 September 2022. The role is Brazier's acting debut, of which he said: "I'm really excited to be joining the cast of EastEnders – so far it’s been perfect. Everybody has been so beautiful to me and made settling in easier than I could’ve hoped. Stepping into the acting world has always been a vision of mine and doing that with EastEnders as a Slater is a blessing, I'm very grateful. Loving every minute of Freddie so far and can't wait to see what’s in store for him in Walford." Producers said that upon his return, Freddie shows traits of his mother through his kindness, but that he is not shy like her and is not afraid to make a scene and cause a stir. Executive producer Chris Clenshaw described Freddie as "a modern-day lad who's in touch with his spiritual side. He's philosophical, accepting, but full of mischief and makes mistakes."

Deirdre Foster

Deirdre Foster, played by Patricia Brake, is the mother of Graham Foster (Alex McSweeney), who attends his rape trial in November 2004. When Deirdre speaks to Little Mo Mitchell (Kacey Ainsworth) about her son Freddie (Alex and Tom Kilby), she reveals that Graham has two daughters from his failed marriage who he never sees. Kate Mitchell (Jill Halfpenny) passes this information onto Mo's legal team, who ask Graham about it under cross examination. Graham lies and is caught out, then berates his mother for telling Mo. Graham is then found guilty.

Little Mo feels sorry for Deirdre and keeps in contact with her until she and Freddie leave Walford in May 2006.

Jean Slater

Jean Slater, played by Gillian Wright, is the mother of Stacey Slater (Lacey Turner). She appears in December 2004 briefly and in December 2005. She returns as a recurring character in June 2006 and begins making regular appearances from November 2006 when she moves in with the Slater family in Walford. Jean departs on 13 January 2011 when she admits herself into a psychiatric hospital after becoming severely depressed following Stacey's departure. She returns to Walford on 29 March 2011 and moves into the Queen Vic with Kat Slater (Jessie Wallace) and Alfie Moon (Shane Richie).

DI Christopher Riddick

Detective Inspector Christopher Riddick, played by Roger Griffiths, is a local police officer. Riddick first appears following Paul Trueman's (Gary Beadle) arrest for running drug errands for Andy Hunter (Michael Higgs). Riddick urges Paul to stop protecting Andy and implicate him and Paul does so. When Paul is later murdered, Riddick and his colleague DS Jones question Andy, who has an alibi for where he had been at the time. Riddick's last appearance is when Chrissie Watts (Tracy-Ann Oberman) is arrested for the murder of her husband Den (Leslie Grantham).

Jake Moon

Jake Moon, played by Joel Beckett, first appears with his brother Danny Moon (Jake Maskall) from 30 December 2004. He is notable for his alliance with gangster Johnny Allen (Billy Murray), his obsession with Johnny's daughter Ruby (Louisa Lytton), his feuds with Phil Mitchell (Steve McFadden), Grant Mitchell (Ross Kemp), Dennis Rickman (Nigel Harman) and Sean Slater (Robert Kazinsky), and his relationship with Chrissie Watts (Tracy-Ann Oberman).

Danny Moon

Danny Moon, played by Jake Maskall, makes his first appearance on 30 December 2004 with his brother Jake (Joel Beckett).  After Danny's employer Johnny Allen (Billy Murray) is beaten severely by Dennis Rickman (Nigel Harman), he orders Danny to murder Dennis. The murder soon leads to Danny leaving Walford. He returns briefly in March 2006 for Get Johnny Week, which ultimately leads to his demise.

Others

References

External links

2004
, EastEnders
2004 in British television